Heike Neu (born 10 February 1965) is a German rower. She competed in two events at the 1984 Summer Olympics.

References

1965 births
Living people
German female rowers
Olympic rowers of West Germany
Rowers at the 1984 Summer Olympics
Sportspeople from Saarbrücken